Generala is a dice game similar to the English game of poker dice, the German game Kniffel, and the Polish game Jacy-Tacy (yahtzee-tahtzee). The American variant of Generala, Yahtzee, is the most popular variant.  Although it is sometimes played in Europe and the United States, Generala is most popular in Ibero-America.

Rules 
Generala is a game played by two or more players.  Players take turns rolling five dice.  After each roll, the player chooses which dice (if any) to keep, and which to reroll.  A player may reroll some or all of the dice up to three times on a turn.

Scoring 
The following combinations earn points:
 Ones, Twos, Threes, Fours, Fives or Sixes. A player may add the numbers on any combination of dice showing the same number.  For example, 4-4-4-2-6 would score 4 + 4 + 4 = 12 points in  "Fours" or 2 points in "Twos"  or even 6 points in "Sixes". Once a player has taken points on a specific combination, he or she may not take points for that combination again during the game.
 Straight.  20 points. A straight is a combination of five consecutive numbers (1-2-3-4-5, or 2-3-4-5-6); it also includes consecutive numbers with 6 and 1, such as 3-4-5-6-1. In essence, any set of five unmatched dice are a straight. A variation allows a 1 to replace a 2 in a straight, e.g. 1, 1, 3, 4, 5 or 1, 3, 4, 5, 6.
 Full house. 30 points. Any set of three combined with a set of two.  For example, 5-5-5-3-3.
 Four of a kind. 40 points. Four dice with the same number.  For example, 2-2-2-2-6.
 Generala. 50 or 60 points. All five dice with the same number.
 Double Generala (optional). 100 or 120 points. All five dice with the same number for the second time in a game.

A player may choose in which qualifying category to score a roll.  For example, one need not enter 3-3-3-3-3 in Generala – it may also go in Threes or Four of a kind.

If a player makes a Straight, Full House, or Four of a Kind on the first roll of a given turn, it is worth 5 or 10 extra points.  A player who makes Generala on the first roll of a turn automatically wins the game.

A player who fails to make any valid score, or chooses not to take any other score, may scratch (eliminate) a category, such as Generala or Twos.  If a player scratches a category, that player cannot score on that category for the rest of the game.  Specifically, if a player scratches Generala and subsequently rolls Generala on the first roll of a turn, it may not be used as an automatic win.

Winning 
The winner, if no one scores an automatic Generala win, is the player who finishes the game with the most points.

References 

Sequence dice games